Wae Rana, or Kolor, is a language of central Flores, in East Nusa Tenggara Province, Indonesia.

References

Sumba languages
Languages of Indonesia